Gaston Milhaud (10 August 1858, Nîmes – 1 October 1918, Paris) was a French philosopher and historian of science.

Gaston Milhaud studied mathematics with Gaston Darboux at the École Normale Supérieure. In 1881 he took a teaching post at the University of Le Havre. In 1891 he became professor of mathematics at Montpellier University, and in 1895 became professor of philosophy there. In 1909 a chair in the history of philosophy in its relationship to the sciences was created for him at the Sorbonne. Milhaud's successor in the chair was Abel Rey.

Works
Leçons sur les origines de la science grecque, Paris, F.Alcan, 1893
Essai sur les conditions et les limites de la certitude logique, 1894
Le rationnel: études complémentaires à l'Essai sur la certitude logique, 1898
Les philosophes-géomètres de la Grèce, Platon et ses prédécesseurs, Paris, 1900
Études sur la pensée scientifique chez les Grecs et chez les modernes, Paris, 1906
Nouvelles études sur l'histoire de la pensée scientifique, 1910
Descartes savant, Paris, 1921
La philosophie de Charles Renouvier, 1927
Études sur Cournot, 1927

References

1858 births
1918 deaths
French philosophers
Philosophers of science
Historians of science
French historians of mathematics
French male non-fiction writers